Benjamin Heller may refer to:
 Ben Heller, American baseball pitcher 
 Benjamin Heller (lawyer), English-American lawyer and politician